Mestika Palace (also known as Istana Mastika) is a royal palace of the crown prince of Selangor, which is located in Section 7, Shah Alam, Selangor, Malaysia.

See also
Istana Alam Shah
Istana Bukit Kayangan
Istana Darul Ehsan

References

Palaces in Selangor
Royal residences in Malaysia
Shah Alam